Verkh-Shestaya is a rural locality (a village) in Polozovoskoye Rural Settlement, Bolshesosnovsky District, Perm Krai, Russia. The population was 27 as of 2010. There are 2 streets.

Geography 
Verkh-Shestaya is located 51 km south of Bolshaya Sosnova (the district's administrative centre) by road. Chernukhi is the nearest rural locality.

References 

Rural localities in Bolshesosnovsky District